Ready to Rumble is a 2000 American buddy comedy film directed by Brian Robbins and written by Steven Brill, which is based on Turner Broadcasting's now defunct professional wrestling promotion, World Championship Wrestling (WCW). The movie draws its title from ring announcer Michael Buffer's catchphrase, "Let's get ready to rumble!" The movie features many wrestlers from WCW.

This film is also notable for being the media debut of future wrestler John Cena, who makes an appearance as an extra in a scene taking place at a gym.

Plot 
Dimwitted sewage workers Gordie Boggs and Sean Dawkins watch their favorite wrestler, WCW World Heavyweight Champion Jimmy King cheated out of the title by Diamond Dallas Page (DDP), an evil WCW promoter named Titus Sinclair, and DDP's partners. After the match, the duo expresses their rage while driving in their septic truck, resulting in a car crash with Gordie and Sean surviving.

After this event, Gordie believes that the car crash was supposed to happen and that they should make Jimmy King once again the WCW World Heavyweight Champion. Gordie asks a friend to find out where King lives, and they go to an unexpected-looking neighborhood where they find King's estranged wife and his parents. King's parents tell Gordie and Sean that King borrowed their mobile home and never returned it. The duo finds King and becomes over-excited. They have a conversation, and when King says that he has given up on wrestling, Gordie and Sean anger him to the point where he suddenly attacks them. This attack on the men prompts a change of heart for King where his passion for wrestling returns. They go visit his wife, who kicks him twice in the crotch for giving her crabs and abandoning her and their son.

They reconcile on her porch as he ices his crotch, and she says she hopes she broke it.  He clarifies that his penis is bruised and it feels like Richard Petty drove a stock car into his scrotum.

His teenage son comes out and has very bad teeth. King vows to win the money and get him a good dentist.

The trio proceeds to go on a road trip to the next WCW Monday Nitro taping in New York City. Gordie sends letters to his father, a police officer who wanted Gordie to follow in his footsteps. Gordie writes that he will not join him in the police force, making him frustrated. Gordie, King, and Sean arrive at the Nitro taping where they hide King in a port-a-potty and they meet one of the Nitro Girls, Sasha. When DDP mocks King on camera, King comes out of the port-a-potty and attacks him. Sinclair then declares a Steel Cage match for the WCW World Heavyweight Championship plus a $1 million cash prize, with the added stipulation that if King loses, he will never wrestle again.

Sasha is impressed by Gordie, and they later go to her apartment to have dinner. When Sasha attempts to have sex with Gordie, he reacts like it's a wrestling match and pushes her off of him. King is in deep need of a trainer for the match, so he, Gordie, and Sean head to the residence of retired wrestler Sal Bandini, where he accepts becoming King's trainer. The trio then heads to a local gym, where King meets his former partner, Bill Goldberg. King asks Goldberg to help in the upcoming match, but he turns him down, saying that King has no chances of winning. Then that night, Sid Vicious and Perry Saturn attack Sal, hospitalizing him. At the hospital, Gordie overhears Sasha at a phone booth, where he learns that Sasha was working under the orders of Sinclair the entire time, therefore realizing his relationship with her was a total sham; Gordie breaks up with her as a result.

As the trio return to Gordie and Sean's home town in Wyoming to continue training, Gordie's father steps in and forces him to abandon his wrestling aspirations and join the police force. Sean and King try to convince Gordie to get out of becoming a police officer, but he refuses. He does, however, hold a huge party for King and wishes him luck in the Steel Cage match.

On the night of the match, King is once again outnumbered by DDP's goons but he suddenly receives help from Goldberg, Booker T, Billy Kidman, Disco Inferno, Sting, and Gordie, who rides in on a police motorcycle debuting his new gimmick as "The Law." King ultimately wins the match by dropping DDP from the top of the cage to the floor of the ring. As King comes up victorious and is once again WCW World Heavyweight Champion, Sinclair gets beaten up by Sean and Gordie (as well as by the fans). Goldberg later asks King to re-team with him, but announces his new partner will be Gordie and their manager will be Sean “Suga Daddy” Dawkins.

An epilogue shows Sean telling some local kids "dreams can come true" at a convenience store, where Gordie and Goldberg teach the store clerk a lesson for being mean to kids by hurling him out on the street. All ends happily as the heroes ride off in a stretch limousine Hummer, together with Sal, now fully recovered in a hot tub with beautiful women.

Cast
 David Arquette as Gordie Boggs a.k.a. “The Law”
 Oliver Platt  as Jimmy King
 Scott Caan  as Sean Dawkins a.k.a. “Sugar Daddy”
 Rose McGowan as Sasha
 Joe Pantoliano as Titus Sinclair
 Martin Landau as Sal Bandini
 Ahmet Zappa as Cashier
 Jill Ritchie as Brittany
 Richard Lineback as Mr. Boggs, Gordie's father
 Chris Owen as Isaac
 Melanie Deanne Moore as Wendy
 Caroline Rhea as Eugenia King
 Tait Smith as Frankie King
 Ellen Albertini Dow as Mrs. MacKenzie
 Kathleen Freeman as Jane King
 Lewis Arquette as Fred King

Wrestling personalities
 Goldberg
 Diamond Dallas Page
 Sting
 Booker T
 Randy Savage
 Bam Bam Bigelow
 Sid Vicious
 Juventud Guerrera
 Curt Hennig
 Disco Inferno
 Billy Kidman
 Konnan
 Rey Mysterio Jr.
 Perry Saturn
 Prince Iaukea
 Van Hammer
 Gorgeous George
 Announcers Michael Buffer, Gene Okerlund, Tony Schiavone and Mike Tenay
 Referees Charles Robinson and Billy Silverman
 The Nitro Girls: Chae, Fyre, Spice, Storm, Tygress
 John Cena (uncredited)

Production

The character of Sal Bandini is based on wrestlers Lou Thesz and Stu Hart. Oliver Platt accidentally struck Randy Savage in the face during the filming of a fantasy scene. The footage of the incident, which was shot over Savage's shoulder, can be seen in the blooper reel shown during the closing credits. Chris Kanyon was Platt's stunt double, and Shane Helms was David Arquette's stunt double. The character of Titus Sinclair is based on WCW President and Executive Producer Eric Bischoff, who was originally planned to star in this movie as a fictionalized version of himself, but was fired from WCW before filming began.

Publicity

Following the release of the movie, WCW decided to generate publicity for the company by running a storyline in which David Arquette, a legitimate wrestling fan, became WCW World Heavyweight Champion. The storyline was reviled by wrestling fans, and Arquette himself reportedly believed it was a bad idea, as he felt that it would damage the value of the WCW World Heavyweight Championship he held in such high regard. While in WCW, he aligned himself with Diamond Dallas Page (despite Page being the movie's villain) and agreed (in storyline) to drop the title to him. He eventually lost the title in the main event of Slamboree involving the three-tiered cage seen in Ready to Rumble, pitting himself against Page and Jeff Jarrett, which ended when he turned on Page and allowed Jarrett to win. Arquette later donated all the money WCW paid him to the families of deceased wrestlers Owen Hart, Brian Pillman, and Brian Hildebrand, plus to wrestler Darren Drozdov who was left paralyzed due to an in-ring accident a year prior.

The Triple Cage was used by WCW only twice: first, at Slamboree 2000, Jeff Jarrett beat Diamond Dallas Page and David Arquette (defending the WCW World Heavyweight Championship) to win the title. In this match, Chris Kanyon was thrown from the roof of one of the cages, "paralyzing" him. The other, taking place on the September 4, 2000 episode of WCW Monday Nitro, was the 2000 edition of the WarGames match.

Critical reception
Ready to Rumble received a largely negative reception, garnering a Rotten Tomatoes rating of 22% based on 72 reviews, with an average score of 4/10. Its consensus states, "Humor at its lowest that isn't funny for kids and is insulting to adults". On Metacritic, which assigns a normalized rating out of 100 to reviews from mainstream critics, the film has an average score of 23, based on 26 critics, indicating "generally unfavorable reviews".

Roger Ebert said that the movie works best when focusing on the aspects of professional wrestling instead of the "wheezy prefab" Dumb and Dumber antics and felt there was misuse of both Platt and Landau, citing the former's comedic talents being wasted and having an actual wrestler in his place instead, and the latter being more suitable in dramatic works. BBC film reviewer Neil Smith commended the efforts of both Platt and Landau in their respective roles but felt the film overall was the typical Hollywood comedy, consisting of "oafish slapstick and lavatorial humour in place of genuine wit or imagination", concluding that it "has its moments, but ultimately feels just as bogus as the Lycra-clad charlatans it lionises." The A.V. Clubs Nathan Rabin criticized the filmmakers for trying to satirize and indulge in the world of wrestling and ignore it for rehashed humor from films like The Wedding Singer and Mallrats, concluding that, "[I]n its attempts not to offend wrestling fans or the wrestlers who make brief, bland appearances, Ready To Rumble is plodding, obvious, toothless, and unfunny."

A. O. Scott of The New York Times mockingly said that the film does a deep exploration into the world of professional wrestling and its core fanbase, but in reality is "not a satire of the idiocy [of professional wrestling], but a long, self-satisfied wallow in it." Chris Gramlich of Exclaim! backhandedly called it "the best Hollywood wrestling movie since No Holds Barred", giving credit to Chris Kanyon's wrestling choreography, the various WCW performers and the contributions from both Landau and McGowan being the film's saving graces, concluding that, "While Ready to Rumble may at times make even the most ardent wrestling ashamed by its use of wrestling stereotypes (some even justified); it does make you laugh almost as often. Almost." The Austin Chronicles Marjorie Baumgarten agreed with the critics about the "asinine plot, premise, and performances" but admitted to laughing at a few moments that shows the film being honest with itself about its creation, concluding that, "Filled with lots of appearances by real wrestling stars, the movie seems a certain shoo-in among a certain demographic. But if you're going, hit the theatres soon because this one looks ready to tumble."

Music

The film score makes extensive use of classical music, both diegetic and non-diegetic. "Fanfare for the Common Man" by Aaron Copland is featured as Jimmy King's theme music. "Siegfried's Funeral March" from Götterdämmerung by German composer Richard Wagner plays quietly in the background during King's initial discomfiture at the hands of Titus Sinclair, played by Joe Pantoliano, and Diamond Dallas Page.

A soundtrack for the film was released by Atlantic Records and 143 Records in both 'clean' and 'explicit' editions. Considering the Kid Rock song "Badwitdaba", the Lower Than You remix, is not deleted on the iTunes version of this soundtrack, it remained one of the only songs of Kid Rock to be available on iTunes, until most of his catalog was released on iTunes in 2013.

References

External links
 
 

2000 films
2000 comedy films
2000s American films
2000s buddy comedy films
2000s comedy road movies
2000s English-language films
2000s sports comedy films
American buddy comedy films
American comedy road movies
American sports comedy films
Films directed by Brian Robbins
Films scored by George S. Clinton
Films set in Atlanta
Films set in Wyoming
Films shot in Los Angeles
Films with screenplays by Steven Brill
Professional wrestling films
Warner Bros. films
World Championship Wrestling